Viișoara may refer to several places:

Romania
 Viișoara, Bihor, a commune in Bihor County
 Viișoara, Botoșani, a commune in Botoșani County
 Viișoara, Cluj, a commune in Cluj County
 Viișoara, Mureș, a commune in Mureș County
 Viișoara, Teleorman, a commune in Teleorman County
 Viișoara, Vaslui, a commune in Vaslui County
 Viișoara, a village in Ștefan cel Mare Commune, Bacău County
 Viișoara, a village in Târgu Trotuș Commune, Bacău County
 Viișoara, a village in Cobadin Commune, Constanța County
 Viișoara, a village in Ulmi Commune, Dâmbovița County
 Viișoara, a village in Drăgotești Commune, Dolj County
 Viișoara, a village in Alexandru cel Bun Commune, Neamț County (itself called Viișoara until 2002)
 Viișoara, a village in Ciumești Commune, Satu Mare County
 Viișoara, a village in Todirești Commune, Vaslui County
 Viișoara, a village in Frâncești Commune, Vâlcea County
 Viișoara, a village in Păunești Commune, Vrancea County
 Viișoara, a village in Vidra Commune, Vrancea County
 Viișoara, a district in the town of Ștefănești, Argeș County
 Viișoara, a district in the city of Bistrița, Bistrița-Năsăud County
 Viișoara, a district in the city of Vaslui, Vaslui County
 Viișoara (river), a tributary of the Prahova in Prahova County

Moldova
 Viişoara, Edineţ, a commune in Edineț district
 Viişoara, Glodeni, a commune in Glodeni district
 Viișoara, a village in Purcari Commune, Ștefan Vodă district

See also 
 Viile (disambiguation)